Maurice Kelly may refer to:
 Maurice Kelly (hurler) (1863–?), Irish hurler
 Maurice Kelly (gridiron football) (born 1972), American football defensive back
 Maurice Kelly (priest) (1884-1926), Anglican priest and co-founder of the Community of the Ascension
 Maurice Kelly (sailor), Bahamian sailor at the 1960 Summer Olympics